Plestiodon sumichrasti, Sumichrast's skink, is a species of lizard which is endemic to Mexico.

References

sumichrasti
Reptiles of Mexico
Reptiles described in 1867
Taxa named by Edward Drinker Cope